There are about 196,800 members of the Religious Society of Friends, or Quakers, in Africa. African Friends make up around 52% of Friends internationally, the largest proportion on any one continent. Kenya has the largest number of Quakers in a single nation – about 146,300 in the year 2012 (according to the Friends World Committee for Consultation).

South Africa & Central and Southern Africa Yearly Meeting
Central and Southern African Yearly Meeting was founded by Friends from London Yearly Meeting.  A meeting was first established in Cape Town in 1728. Friends worshipping in South Africa separated from London Yearly Meeting to become an independent Yearly Meeting in 1948. 
Due to the historic links with London Yearly Meeting, worship is in the unprogrammed tradition, in contrast with Friends' meetings in East Africa.

Kenya

History
On April 23, 1902 three Friends — Arthur Chilson, Edgar Hole, and Willis Hotchkiss — set sail from New York to Mombasa, Kenya.  They went on behalf of the Cleveland Friends Meeting.  From there they made their way across by rail to Kisumu and then by foot to Kaimosi and set up a mission there on August 17.  They came from the programmed tradition of Five Years Meeting (now Friends United Meeting).

From that small beginning, Quakerism grew and spread throughout Kenya during the twentieth century, although it is still concentrated in the western area.  A mission hospital (Kaimosi Hospital) was founded in 1941.  The Friends Bible Institute opened in 1942.  Friends gradually spread into other areas of Kenya, with another hospital (in Lugulu), an epilepsy colony, an agricultural college and a college of technology all being established, as well as many new churches.  It also spread to the neighboring countries of Uganda and Tanzania.  Due to the size, the original East Africa Yearly Meeting split into several smaller Yearly Meetings, some of these splits have been painful.

Organization
There is now one umbrella organisation - Friends Church in Kenya (FCK) - which brings together all fourteen Yearly Meetings in Kenya.

Yearly meetings in Kenya are part of the Friends United Meeting. They include:

Bware Yearly Meeting, based in Suna in southern Nyanza Province
Central Yearly Meeting, based in Lirhanda, just east of Kakamega
Chavakali Yearly Meeting, based in Chavakali, just behind the Boys Secondary School
Chwele Yearly Meeting, based in Chwele, on the southern slopes of Mt Elgon
Chevaywa Yearly Meeting, based in Malava, Matete area
East Africa Yearly Meeting (Kaimosi), based in Tiriki on the Kaimosi mission compound
East Africa Yearly Meeting (North), based in Kitale town
Elgon East Yearly Meeting, based in Kitale town
Elgon Religious Society of Friends, based in Lugulu, just north of Webuye on the Kitale road
Kakamega Yearly Meeting, based in Kakamega at the Amalemba Friends Center
Lugari Yearly Meeting, based in Turbo
Malava Yearly Meeting, based in Malava, just west of the market center
Musingu Yearly Meeting based in Kakamega
Nairobi Yearly Meeting, based at the Friends International Center, Ngong Rd, Nairobi
Tuloi Yearly Meeting, based in Kapsabet
Vihiga Yearly Meeting, based in Vihiga, just west of Majengo
Vokoli Yearly Meeting, based in Wodanga, behind the Moi Girls High School
Soy Yearly Meeting, based in Soy

Uganda 
The Friends Church spread to Uganda from Kenyan Friends, under the auspices of East Africa Yearly Meeting. By 1945, there were Friends Churches in Sibuse, Nabiswa, Kigumba, Nang’oma and Kampala. However, the Friends Church was banned by Idi Amin in 1973, until the end of his leadership of Uganda in 1979. After this, an independent Uganda Yearly Meeting was formed, separate from East Africa Yearly Meeting.

There is also a second Yearly Meeting in Uganda, Evangelical Friends Church - Uganda.  They have applied for affiliation with Evangelical Friends International

Tanzania
The first Quakers moved to Tanzania from Kenya to look for land, which they found on the border of the Serengeti Game Reserve. Subsequent missionary activity from East Africa Yearly Meeting increased membership, with service projects aimed at agricultural training - popularly known as the “Lord’s acre plan”. Due to political pressures, many Kenyans left Tanzania in 1978, with Tanzania Yearly Meeting of Friends being founded as a separate organisation in 1980.

Kyela Monthly Meeting of Friends (Southern Tanzania) was founded as a worship group when a local man (Barnabas Mwaihojo) read about Quakers on the internet, which led to him setting up meetings in three local villages. These have now grown in number, with nine meetings in the southern region of Tanzania. Quakers now have the following meetings in the south: Kyela Friends Church, Muaya, Mbeya, Tunduma, Sumbawanga, Iringa and many others coming up. Daresalaam Friends church has grown well and strong in the city of Daresalaam. Mwanza town has three Friends Meetings. Roria Friends churches along the lake region have also been growing strongly. The Yearly Meeting headquarters is based in Mugumu Serengeti region of Tanzania.

Burundi 
One of the original missionaries from the USA who first planted the Friends Church in Kenya, Arthur Chilson, and his wife Edna, left Kenya to found the Evangelical Friends Church in Burundi in 1934, which was to be run on more evangelical theology, in line with Evangelical Friends International. All foreign missionaries to Burundi were expelled in 1980, and Eglise Evangelique des Amis du Burundi (Evangelical Friends Church Burundi) now exists as an independent Yearly Meeting run by Burundians, affiliated to Evangelical Friends International.

Rwanda 
Eglise Evangelique des Amis au Rwanda was founded by three missionaries, George Morris, Willard Ferguson and Doris Ferguson, who had been serving in Burundi.  Unusually for the Society of Friends, the Friends Church in Rwanda practices water baptism.

Democratic Republic of Congo 
There are two groups of Friends worshipping in the Democratic Republic of Congo. The Communaute des Eglise Evangelique au Congo (Community of Evangelical Church of Congo) are evangelical, programmed Friends affiliated to Evangelical Friends International, formed from missionaries from Burundi in 1981.  They still remain a part of Evangelical Friends Church Burundi rather than being a separate Yearly Meeting.

A completely separate, and much smaller, unprogrammed meeting exists in Kinshasa, with a membership of about 50.

Ghana
Since 1925, there has been one unprogrammed Friends' meeting, Hill House Meeting, in the tradition of London Yearly Meeting, attached to Achimota School and college.

Nigeria
There is a small unprogrammed meeting in Lagos, founded in 1995.

Congo
There is a small unprogrammed worship group in Brazzaville.

References

External links
Statistics by Country
Article by Robert Juma Wafula in Quaker Theology, #5, Autumn 2001
Paper by David Zarembka
Profile of the Luhya People
FUM Yearly Meetings

Africa
Christian denominations in Kenya
Christian denominations in Africa
Christian denominations in Uganda
Christian denominations in Burundi
Christianity in Tanzania
Christian denominations in Rwanda
Christian denominations in the Democratic Republic of the Congo
Christian denominations in Nigeria
Christian denominations in Ghana
Christianity in the Republic of the Congo